Weldon Roycroft Cecil Parke (19 April 1912 – 7 June 1981) was an Irish judge who served as a Judge of the Supreme Court from 1976 to 1981 and a Judge of the High Court from 1974 to 1976.

References

1912 births
1981 deaths
Irish barristers
Judges of the Supreme Court of Ireland
20th-century Irish lawyers
High Court judges (Ireland)
Alumni of Trinity College Dublin
Lawyers from Dublin (city)